The Hon. Paul John Balban is a Gibraltarian politician, State Registered Dietitian and former taxi driver. He was first elected to the Gibraltar Parliament at the 2011 general elections and is now a Gibraltar Government Minister, member of the Gibraltar Socialist Labour Party (GSLP). He is married and has three daughters.

Biography
Paul Balban is married to wife Gina and has three daughters. For many years, Balban has worked as a taxi driver in Gibraltar, and was treasurer of the Gibraltar Taxi Association Committee. He studied Nutrition & Food Science at Oxford Brookes University and also has a Postgraduate degree in Dietetics from King's College London. He later became a State Registered Dietitian, practicing at Central Clinic, in Horse Barrack Lane, Gibraltar.

Political career
Balban was nominated for the GSLP Executive in February 2007, and was one of the ten GSLP-Liberal alliance candidates to contest the general elections that year, but failed to be elected as one of the seventeen Members of Parliament. He was elected into government following the general elections of 2011 with 8,281 votes. The newly elected Chief Minister, Fabian Picardo, appointed Balban as Minister for Traffic, Health and Safety and Technical Services.

References

External links
 Paul Balban – Government of Gibraltar official site

Alumni of King's College London
Alumni of Oxford Brookes University
Government ministers of Gibraltar
Health ministers of Gibraltar
Transport ministers of Gibraltar
Gibraltar Socialist Labour Party politicians
Gibraltarian taxi drivers
Living people
Year of birth missing (living people)